Born for Trouble may refer to:

Born for Trouble (1942 film), American B-film, directed by B. Reeves Eason, starring Van Johnson and Faye Emerson 
Born for Trouble (1955 film), British production directed by Desmond Davis, starring Joan Shawlee
Born for Trouble (album), 1990 release by Willie Nelson